Renato De Riva (7 May 1937 – 10 May 1983) was an Italian speed skater who was active internationally between 1958 and 1968. He competed at the 1960, 1964, and 1968 Winter Olympics with the best result of 14th place in the 10,000 m in 1960 and in the 5000 m in 1964.

References

1937 births
1983 deaths
Italian male speed skaters
Speed skaters at the 1960 Winter Olympics
Speed skaters at the 1964 Winter Olympics
Speed skaters at the 1968 Winter Olympics
Olympic speed skaters of Italy
20th-century Italian people